Leon Stap (sometimes spelled Leon Stop) (September 24, 1928 – 1976) was an American midget professional wrestler better known by his ring name Fuzzy Cupid. During his career, he was the frequent tag team partner of fellow midget wrestler Sky Low Low.

Professional wrestling career
Stap first saw a midget professional wrestling match in Texas, and he decided to try the sport. He later went to Detroit to train at the advice of promoter Norman Brown. He debuted in 1952. In the 1950s, he toured Ontario with other midget wrestlers such as Little Beaver, Lord Littlebrook, and Sky Low Low. During the 1960s, he often teamed with Sky Low Low in matches. The duo competed in the World Wide Wrestling Federation against the midget tag team of Tiny Tim and Pancho López (wrestler).

During his career, he often played the role of the bad guy and was on the receiving end of crowd violence. Because of this violence, Stap endured a fractured vertebra and a four-inch blade wound.

Retired in 1969.

Personal life
The little information available about the personal life of Stap was originally from an article written by Stanley Weston in the October 1959 edition of Man's Magazine. His parents were of normal height. At the age of seven, Stap had infantile paralysis that caused him to be hospitalized for six years. He did not enter public school until the age of seventeen. Prior to entering the world of professional wrestling, he played the role of Grumpy in a traveling production of Snow White.

Stap died in 1976.

Championships and accomplishments
Professional Wrestling Hall of Fame
Midget Wrestler (2005)

See also
 List of premature professional wrestling deaths

References

1928 births
1976 deaths
20th-century American male actors
American male professional wrestlers
Midget professional wrestlers
Professional Wrestling Hall of Fame and Museum
Professional wrestlers from Rhode Island
Stampede Wrestling alumni